

"Water Under the Bridge" is a 2016 single by Adele.

Water Under the Bridge may also refer to:

Music

Albums
 Water Under the Bridge, a 1988 album by Deniece Williams
 Water Under the Bridge, a 1999 album by Sev Lewkowicz

Songs
 "Water Under the Bridge", a song by Dan Seals from the album On Arrival, 1990
 "Water Under the Bridge", a song written by Stephen Sondheim for the 1992 musical Singing Out Loud
 "Water Under the Bridge", a song by Dodgy from the Dodgy Album, 1993
 "Water Under the Bridge", a song by Guy Clark from the album Cold Dog Soup, 1999
 "Water Under the Bridge", a song by Jars of Clay from the album Good Monsters, 2006
 "Water Under the Bridge", a 2022 song by Sam Hunt

Literature and television
 Water Under the Bridge, a 1977 novel by Sumner Locke Elliott
 Water Under the Bridge (miniseries), based on the Elliot novel, 1980